"All My Friends" is a song by American rock band LCD Soundsystem. It was released as the second single from their second studio album Sound of Silver on May 28, 2007 and was written by Pat Mahoney, James Murphy, and Tyler Pope. The song received acclaim from critics and was on many year-end lists. It peaked at #41 on the UK Singles Chart. B-sides for the single include covers of the song by Scottish indie rock band Franz Ferdinand and former Velvet Underground member John Cale.

Reception
"All My Friends" was named the #1 song of 2007 by Pitchfork. In 2009, Pitchfork listed the song at #2 of their Top 500 Tracks of the 2000s.

It was selected by Guardian Unlimited readers as the best single of 2007. Time magazine named "All My Friends" one of The 10 Best Songs of 2007, ranking it at #4. Rolling Stone ranked "All My Friends" as the 41st best song of the 2000s.  In October 2011, NME placed it at number 118 on its list "150 Best Tracks of the Past 15 Years". Rolling Stone went on to place the song at number 87 on its 2021 list of the 500 Greatest Songs of all time.

Music video
The music video for "All My Friends" features a single shot of James Murphy wearing face paint and singing into the camera. As the video progresses, keyboardist Nancy Whang and drummer Pat Mahoney are seen reflected in mirrors behind Murphy. The video was directed by Tom Kuntz.

Composition
"All My Friends" is built on a repetitive piano melody in the key of A major, gradually increasing in volume and dynamics through the duration of the song.

Track listing

7" Part One

7" Part Two

12"

CD

iTunes EP

Charts

Franz Ferdinand version

Scottish indie rock band Franz Ferdinand covered the song as part of the LCD Soundsystem EP A Bunch of Stuff, which was released on September 18, 2007. Their version also appears on the first 7" and CD formats of the original song and as the b-side to their single "Can't Stop Feeling". A music video for the cover was also made, which was directed by Anna McCarthy, the sister of band member Nick McCarthy.

Track listing

7" vinyl
 Domino – RUG331

References

External links
All My Friends: The Melancholy Greatness of the LCD Soundsystem Hit

LCD Soundsystem songs
2007 singles
Songs written by James Murphy (electronic musician)
2006 songs
Krautrock songs
EMI Records singles
Songs about friendship